Lester Lawrence Lessig III (born June 3, 1961) is an American legal scholar, academic, and political activist. He is the Roy L. Furman Professor of Law at Harvard Law School and the former director of the Edmond J. Safra Center for Ethics at Harvard University. Lessig was a candidate for the Democratic Party's nomination for president of the United States in the 2016 U.S. presidential election but withdrew before the primaries.

Views 
Lessig is a proponent of reduced legal restrictions on copyright, trademark, and radio frequency spectrum, particularly in technology applications. In 2001, he founded Creative Commons, a non-profit organization devoted to expanding the range of creative works available for others to build upon and to share legally. Prior to his most recent appointment at Harvard, he was a professor of law at Stanford Law School, where he founded the Center for Internet and Society, and at the University of Chicago. He is a former board member of the Free Software Foundation and Software Freedom Law Center; the Washington, D.C. lobbying groups Public Knowledge and Free Press; and the Electronic Frontier Foundation. He was elected to the American Philosophical Society in 2007.

As a political activist, Lessig has called for state-based activism to promote substantive reform of government with a Second Constitutional Convention. In May 2014, he launched a crowd-funded political action committee which he termed Mayday PAC with the purpose of electing candidates to Congress who would pass campaign finance reform. Lessig is also the co-founder of Rootstrikers, and is on the boards of MapLight and Represent.Us. He serves on the advisory boards of the Democracy Café and the Sunlight Foundation.

In August 2015, Lessig announced that he was exploring a possible candidacy for President of the United States, promising to run if his exploratory committee raised $1 million by Labor Day. After accomplishing this, on September 6, 2015, Lessig announced that he was entering the race to become a candidate for the 2016 Democratic Party's presidential nomination. Lessig described his candidacy as a referendum on campaign finance reform and electoral reform legislation. He stated that, if elected, he would serve a full term as president with his proposed reforms as his legislative priorities. He ended his campaign in November 2015, citing rule changes from the Democratic Party that precluded him from appearing in the televised debates.

Academic career
Lessig earned a B.A. degree in economics and a B.S. degree in management (Wharton School) from the University of Pennsylvania, an M.A. degree in philosophy from the University of Cambridge (Trinity) in England, and a J.D. degree from Yale Law School in 1989. After graduating from law school, he clerked for a year for Judge Richard Posner, at the 7th Circuit Court of Appeals in Chicago, Illinois, and another year for Justice Antonin Scalia at the Supreme Court.

Lessig started his academic career at the University of Chicago Law School, where he was professor from 1991 to 1997. As co-director of the Center for the Study of Constitutionalism in Eastern Europe there, he helped the newly independent Republic of Georgia draft a constitution. From 1997 to 2000, he was at Harvard Law School, holding for a year the chair of Berkman Professor of Law, affiliated with the Berkman Klein Center for Internet & Society. He subsequently joined Stanford Law School, where he established the school's Center for Internet and Society.

Lessig returned to Harvard in July 2009 as professor and director of the Edmond J. Safra Center for Ethics. In 2013, Lessig was appointed as the Roy L. Furman Professor of Law and Leadership; his chair lecture was titled "Aaron's Laws: Law and Justice in a Digital Age."

In popular culture
Lessig was portrayed by Christopher Lloyd in "The Wake Up Call", during season 6 of The West Wing.

Political background

Lessig has been politically liberal since studying philosophy at Cambridge in the mid-1980s. By the late 1980s, two influential conservative judges, Judge Richard Posner and Justice Antonin Scalia, selected him to serve as a law clerk, choosing him because they considered him brilliant rather than for his ideology and effectively making him the "token liberal" on their staffs. Posner would later call him "the most distinguished law professor of his generation."

Lessig has emphasized in interviews that his philosophy experience at Cambridge radically changed his values and career path. Previously, he had held strong conservative or libertarian political views, desired a career in business, was a highly active member of Teenage Republicans, served as the youth governor for Pennsylvania through the YMCA Youth and Government program in 1978, and almost pursued a Republican political career.

What was intended to be a year abroad at Cambridge convinced him instead to stay another two years to complete an undergraduate degree in philosophy and develop his changed political values. During this time, he also traveled in the Eastern Bloc, where he acquired a lifelong interest in Eastern European law and politics.

Lessig remains skeptical of government intervention but favors some regulation, calling himself "a constitutionalist." On one occasion, Lessig also commended the John McCain campaign for discussing fair use rights in a letter to YouTube where it took issue with YouTube for indulging overreaching copyright claims leading to the removal of various campaign videos.

Internet and computer activism

"Code is law"
In computer science, "code" typically refers to the text of a computer program (the source code). In law, "code" can refer to the texts that constitute statutory law. In his 1999 book Code and Other Laws of Cyberspace, Lessig explores the ways in which code in both senses can be instruments for social control, leading to his dictum that "Code is law." Lessig later updated his work in order to keep up with the prevailing views of the time and released the book as Code: Version 2.0 in December 2006.

Remix culture
Lessig has been a proponent of the remix culture since the early 2000s. In his 2008 book Remix he presents this as a desirable cultural practice distinct from piracy. Lessig further articulates remix culture as intrinsic to technology and the Internet. Remix culture is therefore an amalgam of practice, creativity, "read/write" culture and the hybrid economy.

According to Lessig, the problem with the remix comes when it is at odds with stringent US copyright law. He has compared this to the failure of Prohibition, both in its ineffectiveness and in its tendency to normalize criminal behavior. Instead he proposes more lenient licensing, namely Creative Commons licenses, as a remedy to maintain "rule of law" while combating plagiarism.

Free culture

On March 28, 2004 Lessig was elected to the FSF's board of directors. He proposed the concept of "free culture". He also supports free and open-source software and open spectrum. At his free culture keynote at the O'Reilly Open Source Convention 2002, a few minutes of his speech was about software patents, which he views as a rising threat to free software, open source software and innovation.

In March 2006, Lessig joined the board of advisors of the Digital Universe project. A few months later, Lessig gave a talk on the ethics of the Free Culture Movement at the 2006 Wikimania conference. In December 2006, his lecture  On Free, and the Differences between Culture and Code was one of the highlights at 23C3 Who can you trust?.

Lessig claimed in 2009 that, because 70% of young people obtain digital information from illegal sources, the law should be changed.

In a foreword to the Freesouls book project, Lessig makes an argument in favor of amateur artists in the world of digital technologies: "there is a different class of amateur creators that digital technologies have ... enabled, and a different kind of creativity has emerged as a consequence."

Lessig is also a well-known critic of copyright term extensions.

Net neutrality

Lessig has long been known to be a supporter of net neutrality. In 2006, he testified before the US Senate that he believed Congress should ratify Michael Powell's four Internet freedoms and add a restriction to access-tiering, i.e. he does not believe content providers should be charged different amounts. The reason is that the Internet, under the neutral end-to-end design is an invaluable platform for innovation, and the economic benefit of innovation would be threatened if large corporations could purchase faster service to the detriment of newer companies with less capital. However, Lessig has supported the idea of allowing ISPs to give consumers the option of different tiers of service at different prices. He was reported on CBC News as saying that he has always been in favour of allowing internet providers to charge differently for consumer access at different speeds. He said, "Now, no doubt, my position might be wrong. Some friends in the network neutrality movement as well as some scholars believe it is wrong—that it doesn't go far enough. But the suggestion that the position is 'recent' is baseless. If I'm wrong, I've always been wrong."

Legislative reform
Despite presenting an anti-regulatory standpoint in many fora, Lessig still sees the need for legislative enforcement of copyright. He has called for limiting copyright terms for creative professionals to five years, but believes that creative professionals' work, many of them independent, would become more easily and quickly available if bureaucratic procedure were introduced to renew trademarks for up to 75 years after this five-year term.
Lessig has repeatedly taken a stance that privatization through legislation like that seen in the 1980s in the UK with British Telecommunications is not the best way to help the Internet grow. He said, "When government disappears, it's not as if paradise will take its place. When governments are gone, other interests will take their place," "My claim is that we should focus on the values of liberty. If there is not government to insist on those values, then who?" "The single unifying force should be that we govern ourselves."

Legal challenges

From 1999 to 2002, Lessig represented a high-profile challenge to the Sonny Bono Copyright Term Extension Act. Working with the Berkman Center for Internet and Society, Lessig led the team representing the plaintiff in Eldred v. Ashcroft. The plaintiff in the case was joined by a group of publishers who frequently published work in the public domain and a large number of amici including the Free Software Foundation, the American Association of Law Libraries, the Bureau of National Affairs, and the College Art Association.

In March 2003, Lessig acknowledged severe disappointment with his Supreme Court defeat in the Eldred copyright-extension case, where he unsuccessfully tried to convince Chief Justice William Rehnquist, who had sympathies for de-regulation, to back his "market-based" approach to intellectual property regulation.

In August 2013, Lawrence Lessig brought suit against Liberation Music PTY Ltd., after Liberation issued a takedown notice of one of Lessig's lectures on YouTube which had used the song "Lisztomania" by the band Phoenix, whom Liberation Music represents. Lessig sought damages under section 512(f) of the Digital Millennium Copyright Act, which holds parties liable for misrepresentations of infringement or removal of material. Lessig was represented by the Electronic Frontier Foundation and Jones Day. In February 2014, the case ended with a settlement in which Liberation Music admitted wrongdoing in issuing the takedown notice, issued an apology, and paid a confidential sum in compensation.

Killswitch

In October 2014, Killswitch, a film featuring Lawrence Lessig, as well as Aaron Swartz, Tim Wu, and Edward Snowden received its World Premiere at the Woodstock Film Festival, where it won the award for Best Editing. In the film, Lessig frames the story of two young hacktivists, Swartz and Snowden, who symbolize the disruptive and dynamic nature of the Internet. The film reveals the emotional bond between Lessig and Swartz, and how it was Swartz (the mentee) that challenged Lessig (the mentor) to engage in the political activism that has led to Lessig's crusade for campaign finance reform.

In February 2015, Killswitch was invited to screen at the Capitol Visitor's Center in Washington DC by Congressman Alan Grayson. The event was held on the eve of the Federal Communications Commission's historic decision on Net Neutrality. Lessig, Congressman Grayson, and Free Press (organization) CEO Craig Aaron spoke about the importance of protecting net neutrality and the free and open Internet.

Congressman Grayson states that Killswitch is "One of the most honest accounts of the battle to control the Internet -- and access to information itself." Richard von Busack of the Metro Silicon Valley, writes of Killswitch, "Some of the most lapidary use of found footage this side of The Atomic Café". Fred Swegles of the Orange County Register, remarks, "Anyone who values unfettered access to online information is apt to be captivated by Killswitch, a gripping and fast-paced documentary." Kathy Gill of GeekWire asserts that "Killswitch is much more than a dry recitation of technical history. Director Ali Akbarzadeh, producer Jeff Horn, and writer Chris Dollar created a human centered story. A large part of that connection comes from Lessig and his relationship with Swartz."

The Electors Trust
In December 2016 Lawrence Lessig and Laurence Tribe established The Electors Trust under the aegis of EqualCitizens.US to provide pro bono legal counsel as well as a secure communications platform for those of the 538 members of the United States Electoral College who are regarding a vote of conscience against Donald Trump in the presidential election.

Lessig hosts the podcast Another Way in conjunction with The Young Turks Network

Money-in-politics activism

At the iCommons iSummit 07, Lessig announced that he would stop focusing his attention on copyright and related matters and work on political corruption instead, as the result of a transformative conversation with Aaron Swartz, a young internet prodigy whom Lessig met through his work with Creative Commons. This new work was partially facilitated through his wiki, Lessig Wiki, which he has encouraged the public to use to document cases of corruption. Lessig criticized the revolving-door phenomenon in which legislators and staffers leave office to become lobbyists and have become beholden to special interests.

In February 2008, a Facebook group formed by law professor John Palfrey encouraged Lessig to run for Congress from California's 12th congressional district, the seat vacated by the death of Representative Tom Lantos. Later that month, after forming an "exploratory project", he decided not to run for the vacant seat.

Rootstrikers

Despite having decided to forgo running for Congress himself, Lessig remained interested in attempting to change Congress to reduce corruption. To this end, he worked with political consultant Joe Trippi to launch a web based project called "Change Congress". In a press conference on March 20, 2008, Lessig explained that he hoped the Change Congress website would help provide technological tools voters could use to hold their representatives accountable and reduce the influence of money on politics. He is a board member of MAPLight.org, a nonprofit research group illuminating the connection between money and politics.

Change Congress later became Fix Congress First, and was finally named Rootstrikers. In November 2011, Lessig announced that Rootstrikers would join forces with Dylan Ratigan's Get Money Out campaign, under the umbrella of the United Republic organization. Rootstrikers subsequently came under the aegis of Demand Progress, an organization co-founded by Aaron Swartz.

Article V convention

In 2010, Lessig began to organize for a national Article V convention. He co-founded Fix Congress First! with Joe Trippi. In a speech in 2011, Lessig revealed that he was disappointed with Obama's performance in office, criticizing it as a "betrayal", and he criticized the president for using "the (Hillary) Clinton playbook". Lessig has called for state governments to call for a national Article V convention, including by supporting Wolf-PAC, a national organization attempting to call an Article V convention to address the problem. The convention Lessig supports would be populated by a "random proportional selection of citizens" which he suggested would work effectively. He said "politics is a rare sport where the amateur is better than the professional." He promoted this idea at a September 24–25, 2011, conference he co-chaired with the Tea Party Patriots' national coordinator, in Lessig's October 5, 2011, book, Republic, Lost: How Money Corrupts Congress—and a Plan to Stop It, and at the Occupy protest in Washington, DC. Reporter Dan Froomkin said the book offers a manifesto for the Occupy Wall Street protestors, focusing on the core problem of corruption in both political parties and their elections. An Article V convention does not dictate a solution, but Lessig would support a constitutional amendment that would allow legislatures to limit political contributions from non-citizens, including corporations, anonymous organizations, and foreign nationals, and he also supports public campaign financing and electoral college reform to establish the one person, one vote principle.

New Hampshire Rebellion
The New Hampshire Rebellion is a walk to raise awareness about corruption in politics. The event began in 2014 with a 185-mile march in New Hampshire. In its second year the walk expanded to include other locations in New Hampshire.

From January 11 to 24, 2014, Lessig and many others, like New York activist Jeff Kurzon, marched from Dixville Notch, New Hampshire to Nashua (a 185-mile march) to promote the idea of tackling "the systemic corruption in Washington". Lessig chose this language over the related term "campaign finance reform," commenting that "Saying we need campaign finance reform is like referring to an alcoholic as someone who has a liquid intake problem." The walk was to continue the work of NH native Doris "Granny D" Haddock, and in honor of deceased activist Aaron Swartz. The New Hampshire Rebellion marched 16 miles from Hampton to New Castle on the New Hampshire Seacoast. The initial location was also chosen because of its important and visible role in the quadrennial "New Hampshire primaries", the traditional first primary of the presidential election.

2016 presidential candidacy

Lessig announced the launch of his long shot presidential campaign on September 6, 2015.
On August 11, 2015, Lessig announced that he had launched an exploratory campaign for the purpose of exploring his prospects of winning the Democratic Party's nomination for president of the United States in the 2016 election. Lessig pledged to seek the nomination if he raised $1 million by Labor Day 2015. The announcement was widely reported in national media outlets, and was timed to coincide with a media blitz by the Lessig 2016 Campaign. Lessig was interviewed in The New York Times and Bloomberg. Campaign messages and Lessig's electoral finance reform positions were circulated widely on social media. His campaign was focused on a single issue: The Citizen Equality Act, a proposal that couples campaign finance reform with other laws aimed at curbing gerrymandering and ensuring voting access. As an expression of his commitment to the proposal, Lessig initially promised to resign once the Citizen Equality Act became law and turn the presidency over to his vice president, who would then serve out the remainder of the term as a typical American president and act on a variety of issues. In October 2015, Lessig abandoned his automatic resignation plan and adopted a full policy platform for the presidency, though he did retain the passage of the Citizen Equality Act as his primary legislative objective.

Lessig made a single campaign stop in Iowa, with an eye toward the first-in-the-nation precinct caucuses: at Dordt College, in Sioux Center, in late October.  He announced the end of his campaign on November 2, 2015.

Electoral College reform
In 2017, Lessig announced a movement to challenge the winner-take-all Electoral College vote allocation in the various states, called Equal Votes. Lessig was also a counsel for electors in the Supreme Court case Chiafalo v. Washington where the court decided states could force electors to follow the state's popular vote.

Awards and honors
In 2002, Lessig received the Award for the Advancement of Free Software from the Free Software Foundation (FSF). He also received the Scientific American 50 Award for having "argued against interpretations of copyright that could stifle innovation and discourse online." In 2006, Lessig was elected to the American Academy of Arts and Sciences.

In 2011, Lessig was named to the Fastcase 50, "honoring the law's smartest, most courageous innovators, techies, visionaries, and leaders." Lessig was awarded honorary doctorates by the Faculty of Social Sciences at Lund University, Sweden in 2013 and by the Université catholique de Louvain in 2014. Lessig received the 2014 Webby Lifetime Achievement award for co-founding Creative Commons and defending net neutrality and the free and open software movement.

Personal life
Lessig was born in Rapid City, South Dakota, the son of Patricia (West), who sold real estate, and Lester L. "Jack" Lessig, an engineer. He grew up in Williamsport, Pennsylvania.

In May 2005, it was revealed that Lessig had experienced sexual abuse by the director at the American Boychoir School, which he had attended as an adolescent. Lessig reached a settlement with the school in the past, under confidential terms. He revealed his experiences in the course of representing another student victim, John Hardwicke, in court. In August 2006, he succeeded in persuading the New Jersey Supreme Court to radically restrict the scope of immunity,  which had protected nonprofits that failed to prevent sexual abuse from legal liability.

Lessig is married to Bettina Neuefeind, a German-born Harvard University colleague. The two married in 1999. He and Neuefeind have three children: Willem, who is a Crypto-Miner, Coffy, who is a streamer, and Tess.

Defamation lawsuit against the New York Times
In 2019, during the criminal investigation of Jeffrey Epstein, it was discovered that the MIT Media Lab, under former president Joichi Ito, had accepted secret donations from Epstein after Epstein had been convicted on criminal charges. Ito eventually resigned as president following this discovery. After making supportive comments to Ito, Lessig wrote a Medium post in September 2019 to explain his stance. In his post, Lessig acknowledged that universities should not take donations from convicted criminals like Epstein who had become wealthy through actions unrelated to their criminal convictions; however, if such donations were to be accepted, it was better to take them secretly rather than publicly connect the university to the criminal. Lessig's essay drew criticism, and about a week later, Nellie Bowles of The New York Times had an interview with Lessig in which he reiterated his stance related to such donations broadly. The article used the headline "A Harvard Professor Doubles Down: If You Take Epstein’s Money, Do It in Secret", which Lessig confirmed was based on a statement he had made to the Times. Lessig took issue with the headline overlooking his argument that MIT should not accept such donations in the first place and also criticized the first two lines of the article which read "It is hard to defend soliciting donations from the convicted sex offender Jeffrey Epstein. But Lawrence Lessig, a Harvard Law professor, has been trying." He subsequently accused the Times of writing clickbait with the headline crafted to defame him, and stated that the circulation of the article on social media had hurt his reputation.

In January 2020, Lessig filed a defamation lawsuit against the Times, including writer Bowles, business editor Ellen Pollock, and executive editor Dean Baquet. The Times stated they will "vigorously" defend against Lessig's claim, and believe that what they had published was accurate and had been reviewed by senior editors following Lessig's initial complaints.

In April 2020, the New York Times changed its original headline to read: "What Are the Ethics of Taking Tainted Funds? A conversation with Lawrence Lessig about Jeffrey Epstein, M.I.T. and reputation laundering."  Lessig reported he subsequently withdrew his defamation lawsuit.

Notable cases
 Golan v. Gonzales (representing multiple plaintiffs)
 Eldred v. Ashcroft (representing plaintiff Eric Eldred) Lost
 Kahle v. Ashcroft (also see Brewster Kahle) Dismissed
 United States v. Microsoft (special master and author of an amicus brief addressing the Sherman Act)
 Lessig was appointed special master by Judge Thomas Penfield Jackson in 1997; the appointment was vacated by the United States Court of Appeals for the District of Columbia Circuit; the appellate court ruled that the powers granted to Lessig exceeded the scope of the Federal statute providing for special masters; Judge Jackson then solicited Lessig's amicus brief
 Lessig said about this appointment: "Did Justice Jackson pick me to be his special master because he had determined I was the perfect mix of Holmes, and Ed Felten? No, I was picked because I was a Harvard Law Professor teaching the law of cyberspace. Remember: So is 'fame' made."
 MPAA v. 2600 (submitted an amicus brief with Yochai Benkler in support of 2600)
 McCutcheon v. FEC (submitted an amicus brief in support of FEC)
 Chiafalo v. Washington (representing Chiafalo)

Bibliography

 Code and Other Laws of Cyberspace (Basic Books, 1999) 
 The Future of Ideas (Vintage Books, 2001) 
 Free Culture (Penguin, 2004) 
 Code: Version 2.0 (Basic Books, 2006) 
 Remix: Making Art and Commerce Thrive in the Hybrid Economy (Penguin, 2008) 
 Republic, Lost: How Money Corrupts Congress—and a Plan to Stop It (Twelve, 2011) 
  One Way Forward: The Outsider's Guide to Fixing the Republic (Kindle Single/Amazon, 2012)
 Lesterland: The Corruption of Congress and How to End It (2013, CC-BY-NC) 
 Republic, Lost: The Corruption of Equality and the Steps to End It (Twelve, rev. ed., 2015) 
 America, Compromised (University of Chicago Press, 2018) 
 Fidelity & Constraint: How the Supreme Court Has Read the American Constitution (Oxford University Press, 2019) 
 They Don't Represent Us: Reclaiming Our Democracy (Dey Street/William Morrow, 2019)

Filmography
 RiP!: A Remix Manifesto, a 2008 documentary film
The Internet's Own Boy: The Story of Aaron Swartz, 2014 documentary film
 Killswitch, 2015 documentary film
 The Swamp, 2020 documentary film
 Kim Dotcom: The Most Wanted Man Online, 2021 documentary film

See also 
 List of law clerks of the Supreme Court of the United States (Seat 9)
 Copyleft
 Free software movement
 Free content
 FreeCulture.org
 Open educational resources
 Gratis versus libre
 Open content
 Law of the Horse
 Lobbying in the United States
 Second Constitutional Convention of the United States proposal for constitutional reform
 Killswitch (film)

References

External links

  (includes Curriculum Vitae and Lessig blog 2002–2009)
  Lessig Blog, beyond 2009
 
  (Presidential Campaign site)
 
 
 

 
1961 births
21st-century American non-fiction writers
21st-century American politicians
Access to Knowledge activists
Alumni of Trinity College, Cambridge
American bloggers
American lawyers
American legal scholars
American people of German descent
American political writers
Articles containing video clips
Candidates in the 2016 United States presidential election
Computer law scholars
Copyright activists
Copyright scholars
Creative Commons-licensed authors
Harvard Law School faculty
Law clerks of the Supreme Court of the United States
Living people
Massachusetts Democrats
Members of the Creative Commons board of directors
Open content activists
People from Rapid City, South Dakota
People from Williamsport, Pennsylvania
Scholars of constitutional law
Sexual abuse victim advocates
Stanford Law School faculty
University of Chicago faculty
Webby Award winners
Wharton School of the University of Pennsylvania alumni
Wired (magazine) people
Yale Law School alumni